Prasophyllum pulchellum, commonly known as the pretty leek orchid, is a species of orchid endemic to Tasmania. It has a single tubular, green leaf and up to twelve light reddish-brown flowers with a cream-coloured to whitish labellum. It is widely distributed in Tasmania and only about 130 plants are known but it is difficult to locate in the low heath where it grows and more individuals may survive.

Description
The edges of the upturned part of the labellum having crinkled, wavy edges and there is a shiny green, channelled callus in its centre extending just past the bend. Flowering occurs from late October through November.

Taxonomy and naming
Prasophyllum pulchellum was first formally described in 1998 by David Jones from a specimen collected on South Bruny Island and the description was published in Australian Orchid Research. The specific epithet (pulchellum) is a Latin word meaning "beautiful".

Distribution and habitat
The pretty leek orchid is only known from a six sites in the north and south of Tasmania. It grows in heath which often becomes very dense in the absence of fire, making the orchid difficult to locate.

Conservation
The population of P. pulchellum has been estimated as fewer than 150. It is classed as "Endangered" under the Tasmanian Threatened Species Protection Act 1995 and as Critically Endangered under the Commonwealth Government Environment Protection and Biodiversity Conservation Act 1999 (EPBC) Act. The main threats to the population are urban development, inappropriate fire regimes and loss of population due to the loss of scattered individual orchids.

References

External links 
 

pulchellum
Flora of Tasmania
Endemic orchids of Australia
Plants described in 1998